Postplatyptilia sandraella is a moth of the family Pterophoridae. It is known from Bolivia and Paraguay.

The wingspan is 12–14 mm. Adults are on wing in January.

References

sandraella
Moths described in 1996